Laugh, Clown, Laugh is a 1928 American silent drama film starring Lon Chaney and Loretta Young (her film debut). The movie was directed by Herbert Brenon and produced by Irving G. Thalberg for MGM Pictures. The theme song "Laugh, Clown, Laugh" was composed by Ted Fiorito (music) and Lewis and Young (lyrics).

Stills exist that show Chaney in his clown make-up. The sets were designed by Cedric Gibbons. The film was in production from December 19, 1927, to February 2, 1928, and cost $293,000 to make. The worldwide box office gross was $1,102,000.

"Laugh, Clown, Laugh" is readily available today on DVD. The existing print, however, is not 100% complete; it is missing reel #4, but the missing footage does not severely impact the story.

An alternate happy ending wherein Tito survives his fall, Simonetta marries Luigi, and they all remain close friends, was shot at the studio's insistence in case some studios preferred that ending, but the footage no longer exists.

Plot
Tito (Lon Chaney), a traveling circus clown, finds an abandoned child. He adopts her and raises her as his daughter, naming her Simonetta after his brother Simon (Bernard Siegel). One day the now-teenaged Simonetta (Loretta Young) encounters Count Luigi Ravelli (Nils Asther), a wealthy man who falls madly in love with her, but upon seeing that he already has a girlfriend, she rejects him. She returns home to the circus and Tito suddenly realizes she is no longer a child. Tito further realizes he has sexual feelings for Simonetta, but also knows his feelings are improper because he raised her as his daughter.

Luigi begins having fits of uncontrollable laughter because Simonetta has rejected him. Tito falls into melancholia because of his conflicted interests about Simonetta. They both see the same doctor about their conditions and meet each other there for the first time. They share their respective troubles and believe maybe they can help each other, not knowing they are both in love with the same woman. Nonetheless, the three eventually develop a strong friendship until Luigi asks Simonetta to marry him. Simonetta eventually accepts Luigi's proposal, which throws Tito into an even deeper melancholy. Simonetta learns of Tito's affections for her before she marries Luigi. She tells Tito that she loved him before she loved Luigi, then goes to break her engagement with Luigi.

While Simonetta is breaking her engagement, Tito and Simon begin rehearsing some new material for their "Flik and Flok" act. Tito does not believe Simonetta's love is genuine, but that it is just pity she feels for him and at the same time, he knows that, as her adopted father, it would be immoral to have her become his wife. Driven insane by his internal conflict, he decides to practice his new routine from the act without protection. Despite his brother Simon's protests, he continues with the stunt and falls from the highwire. 
Tito dies from his fall, freeing Simonetta to marry Luigi.

Cast
 Lon Chaney as Tito / Flik
 Loretta Young as Simonetta
 Nils Asther as Count Luigi Ravelli
 Bernard Siegel as Simon
 Cissy Fitzgerald as Giacinta
 Gwen Lee as Lucretia
 Leo Feodoroff
 Emmett King as the Doctor
 Julie DeValora as the Nurse
 Helena Dime as Woman at Party
 Frankie Genardi as Little Boy at Tito's Death
 Mickey McBan as 2nd Little Boy
 Lilliana Genardi as Little Girl
 Carl M. Leviness as Party Guest

Production
The film is based on the 1923 Broadway stage production Laugh, Clown, Laugh that starred Lionel Barrymore as Tito, and his second wife Irene Fenwick in the role of Simonetta. The production also featured Lucille Kahn in a supporting role.

MGM was thinking of offering Chaney this film in 1925, but delayed production for several years, because Chaney had already appeared as a clown in the 1924 film He Who Gets Slapped and due to speculation that Lionel Barrymore might wish to reprise his role from the stage production.  Instead MGM would pair Barrymore with Chaney in West of Zanzibar.

Cast
As a trouping comic stage actor in his youth, Chaney would have been acquainted with clown performers of lesser-known fame. In preparation for this film and He Who Gets Slapped Chaney also studied the clown makeup of circus performers and legendary 19th-century clown stage actors like Joseph Grimaldi and George L. Fox, the latter of Humpty Dumpty fame. The film was said to have been Chaney's favorite of all his roles.

This film was Loretta Young's first major movie role, at the age of fourteen. In interviews near the end of her life, she expressed her gratitude toward Chaney for his kindness and guidance, and for protecting her from director Brenon's sometimes harsh treatment.

Music
An eponymous musical theme was written specially for the film. It was to be played for audiences in movie theatres [in the minutes before screenings of the movie]. It became a hit record.  Chaney's set musicians played the song at his 1930 funeral.

Reception

Critical reception
Author and film critic Leonard Maltin awarded the film three out of a possible four stars, calling it " the perfect example of Chaney's unmatched talent for turning tearjerking melodrama into heartbreaking tragedy."

Historian Jon C. Mirsalis opined "LAUGH, CLOWN, LAUGH is certainly one of the loveliest of Chaney's films. The film was directed by Herbert Brenon, and was stunningly photographed by James Wong Howe, probably the finest cinematographer to work on a Chaney picture. Combined with a radiant 14-year old Loretta Young, and a higher than average budget, the end result is a beautiful film that holds up wonderfully today."

"This is the best work of Lon Chaney since THE UNHOLY THREE, and it is a great relief to have him minus his usual sinister make-up. His characterization of Tito Flik is perfect." --- Photoplay

"Mr. Chaney, discarding for the moment his usual propensity for distorted limbs, is a properly sentimental clown." --- New York Herald Tribune

"Mr. Chaney is superb as the clown. It makes one realize his mental state vividly. The closing scenes where he is shown performing his death-defying acts, and committing suicide, are the most pathetic of them all. It should draw big crowds in any theatre and please them all". --- Harrison's Reports

"Another romantic play with a semi-tragic finale....In this case, Lon Chaney as the star should be almost an insurance of a draw. Production is excellent in Herbert Brenon's best style. Chaney does some splendid acting as the clown who makes the world laugh while his heart is breaking with a vain love...." ---Variety

"Except for an expertly filmed closing sequence...Herbert Brenon's pictorial translation of LAUGH CLOWN LAUGH...is a somewhat dawdling and sparkless contribution. Even Lon Chaney's undoubtedly earnest interpretation...fails to arouse the necessary sympathy...Miss Young is attractive and dainty, but her talent as an actress is not called for to any great extent in this picture." ---The New York Times

"Chaney without his crutches, Chaney the middle-aged lover, Chaney the clown, Chaney the actor! These are good entertainers, particularly the latter, and LAUGH CLOWN LAUGH is good entertainment...I believe I'm giving the impression that I think Mr. Chaney is a whale of an actor. If I'm not, I'm sorry, because that--at least that--is what I think he is." --- Exhibitors Herald-World

"Lon Chaney, I think, was one of the real geniuses in our business. There aren't too many of them, but I think surely he was one. I think Lon Chaney was able to separate his work from his life. When he was working, he actually was not in this world at all. He was just inside that character so if that character was up, he was up. If the character was down, he was down." ---Quote, Loretta Young interview

Accolades
The film is recognized by American Film Institute in these lists:
 2002: AFI's 100 Years...100 Passions – Nominated

2002 re-score, 2003 release
In January 2002, the third annual Young Film Composers Competition sponsored by Turner Classic Movies awarded the right to re-score this film to a college student named Scott Salinas. In November 2002, he scored it at Todd-AO, with the film first aired in February 2003.

References

External links

 
 
 
 
 Laugh, Clown, Laugh at Virtual History
 Lobby poster to the film
 Stills at silenthollywood.com
 Stills at Nils Asther website

1928 films
American silent feature films
American black-and-white films
Films about clowns
Films directed by Herbert Brenon
American romantic drama films
Metro-Goldwyn-Mayer films
American films based on plays
1928 romantic drama films
1920s American films
Silent romantic drama films
Silent American drama films